Staytonville is an unincorporated community in Sussex County, Delaware, United States. Staytonville is located at the intersection of Delaware Route 36, Staytonville Road, and Memory Road northeast of Greenwood.

References

Unincorporated communities in Sussex County, Delaware
Unincorporated communities in Delaware